Brain Age, known as Dr Kawashima's Brain Training in PAL regions, is a series of video games developed and published by Nintendo, based on the work of Ryuta Kawashima.

Video games

The Brain Age games, known as Brain Training in Japan and Europe, are presented as a set of mini-games that are designed to help improve one's mental processes. These activities were informed by Dr. Ryuta Kawashima, a Japanese neuroscientist, and are aimed to stimulate multiple parts of the brain to help improve one's abilities and combat normal aging effects on the brain. Activities are generally based on two or more mental stimuli and are to be completed as fast and as correctly as possible. For example, common activities include Calculations, where the user is presented with a list of single-operator math operations and the user uses the system's touch screen to write their answer to each question, and Stroop Test based on the Stroop effect, where players must say into the unit's microphone the color of the text of a color name that appears on the screen. Activities are usually presented in both a Training mode, which allows the user to practice to get the hang of how the activities are played out and a Brain Age Check, where the user completes multiple activities outside of practice, with the game estimating the person's "brain age" based on how quickly they completed all the tests and accounting for any incorrect answers. The game tracks a user's performance over time to help show the effects of daily interactions with the game.

Brain Age: Train Your Brain in Minutes a Day!

Brain Age 2: More Training in Minutes a Day!

Brain Age Express

Brain Age: Concentration Training

Dr Kawashima's Brain Training for Nintendo Switch 

A new Brain Age title for the Nintendo Switch, titled , and as Dr Kawashima's Brain Training for Nintendo Switch for Europe and Australia, was released in Japan on December 27, 2019, and was released in Europe and Australia on January 3, 2020. The game uses some of the new features of the Switch, including the gyroscope and infrared camera in the Joy-Con units, as part of the input into the activities, alongside other returning training activities. A Switch-compatible stylus was also released that day in Japan to support some of those activities.

Common elements

Mathematics
A DSiWare version titled Brain Age Express: Math was released in North America on April 5, 2009, and in the PAL regions on June 19, 2009.

Arts & Letters 
A DSiWare version titled Brain Age Express: Arts & Letters was released in North America on August 10, 2009.

Sudoku

The North American, European and Korean versions of the first two Brain Age titles featured a Sudoku mode. The player can choose between two modes of play – with notification, or without. When played with notification, the game allows the player to miss only five times before the puzzle is automatically ended before completion. Each miss results in a 20-minute penalty which is added to the player's time. Additionally, if the best time for a puzzle was achieved with notification, the game will make note of that next to the best time.

The majority of the puzzle takes place on the touch screen, which displays the entire Sudoku puzzle. The player must first tap on the square he wishes to fill in, and the touch screen will show a zoomed-in image of that square while the other screen shows a zoomed out version of the puzzle. While zoomed in, you are able to move to another square next to it by using one of the arrows. To fill in a square, the player must handwrite the number using the stylus. Once the number is written and the player moves on from that square, it will be converted into a cleaner version of the number.

Brain Age also takes advantage of a strategy used in pen and paper Sudoku puzzles, in which the person marks which squares a number could possibly be by writing a miniature number. There are also four options at the player's disposal – Undo, Erase, Zoom Out, and Save & Quit. Undo allows the player to revert the latest change in the puzzle, Erase allows the player to erase everything in one square (alternatively, the player can circle just one number to erase it), Zoom Out is used to go back to a zoomed-out view after the player has zoomed in on a square, and Save & Quit allows the player to do a quick save and quit the puzzle, which is erased once the player resumes.

A DSiWare version of this game entitled Brain Age Express: Sudoku was released in the PAL regions on July 24, 2009, and in North America on August 17, 2009., but it was retired from the DSi Shop on June 19, 2015.

Sales
The first two games in the series reached a combined total of 33 million units sold globally.

Other media
A book based on Kawashima's work was released, titled Train Your Brain: 60 Days to a Better Brain.

Body and Brain Connection, also known as Dr. Kawashima's Body and Brain Exercises in PAL regions, is a puzzle video game developed and published by Namco Bandai Games for the Xbox 360's Kinect platform. It was released in 2010. The player is guided through the brain age tests by Ryuta Kawashima.

Notes

References

External links
 Official website

 
Video game franchises
Nintendo franchises
Video game franchises introduced in 2005